Suetena Asomua (born 6 July 1998) is a New Zealand rugby union player who plays for the Karaka club and Counties Manukau in the National Provincial Championship. His playing position is prop.

He made his Super Rugby debut for Moana Pasifika against the Blues on 29 March 2022.

Reference list

External links
itsrugby.co.uk profile

1998 births
New Zealand rugby union players
Living people
Rugby union props
Counties Manukau rugby union players
Moana Pasifika players